Marapana is a genus of moths of the family Erebidae. The genus was erected by Frederic Moore in 1885.

Species
Marapana angulata Bethune-Baker, 1908 New Guinea
Marapana indistincta Rothschild, 1915 New Guinea
Marapana pulverata (Guenée, 1852) India, Sri Lanka, Java, New Guinea

References

Calpinae
Moth genera